Douglas Purviance (born July 18, 1952 in Turner Station, Maryland) is a jazz trombonist. He began his professional career as a member of the Stan Kenton Orchestra, playing bass trombone and tuba from 1975 to 1977. Mostly, he works as a studio session bass trombonist and is not known for improvising.

He graduated from Towson State University in 1975 and obtained a master's degree from the Manhattan School of Music in 1992. He settled in New York City in 1977, playing a variety of commercial and jazz trombone jobs and eventually winning a chair in the Thad Jones/Mel Lewis Orchestra. He was a charter member of the Carnegie Hall Jazz Band and has toured extensively with Slide Hampton, Steve Turre, Dizzy Gillespie, and the Mingus Big Band. He has appeared as an incidental player on hundreds of recordings, notably on Grammy-nominated albums by Joe Henderson and the Vanguard Jazz Orchestra.

On February 8, 2009, he won a Grammy Award as co-producer in the Best Large Jazz Ensemble Album category for Monday Night Live at the Village Vanguard. He worked as co-producer and trombonist on the Grammy-nominated album  OverTime: Music of Bob Brookmeyer by the Vanguard Jazz Orchestra and in the same roles for the album Mists: Charles Ives for Jazz Orchestra.

Discography

As sideman
With Dizzy Gillespie
 Things to Come (MCG, 2002)
 Dizzy's Business (MCG, 2006)
 I'm BeBoppin' Too (Half Note, 2008)

With Slide Hampton
 World of Trombones (West 54, 1979)
 Dedicated to Diz (Telarc, 1993)
 Slide Plays Jobim (Alleycat, 2002)
 Spirit of the Horn (MCG, 2002)

With Stan Kenton
 Kenton '76 (Creative World, 1976)
 Journey Into Capricorn (Creative World, 1976)
 Live in Europe (Decca, 1977)

With Mel Lewis
 Live in Montreux (MPS, 1981)
 20 Years at the Village Vanguard (Atlantic, 1986)
 Soft Lights and Hot Music (Musicmasters, 1988)
 The Definitive Thad Jones (Musicmasters, 1989)
 To You: A Tribute to Mel Lewis (Musicmasters, 1991)

With Steve Turre
 Sanctified Shells (Antilles, 1993)
 Rhythm Within (Antilles, 1995)
 Steve Turre (Verve, 1997)
 One4J (Telarc, 2003)

With Vanguard Jazz Orchestra
 Lickety Split (New World, 1997)
 Thad Jones Legacy (New World, 1999)
 Can I Persuade You? (Planet Arts, 2001)
 The Way (Planet Arts, 2004)
 Up from the Skies (Planet Arts, 2006)
 Monday Night Live at the Village Vanguard (Planet Arts, 2008)
 Forever Lasting (Planet Arts, 2011)
 Overtime Music of Bob Brookmeyer (Planet Arts, 2014)

With Gerald Wilson
 New York, New Sound (Mack Avenue, 2003)
 In My Time (Mack Avenue, 2005)
 Monterey Moods (Mack Avenue, 2007)
 Detroit (Mack Avenue, 2009)
 Legacy (Mack Avenue, 2011)

With others
 Mario Bauza, Tanga (Messidor, 1992)
 Dee Dee Bridgewater, Dear Ella (Verve, 1997)
 Michel Camilo, One More Once (Columbia, 1994)
 Richie Cole, Kush (Heads Up 1995)
 Robin Eubanks, Different Perspectives (Bamboo, 1988)
 Robin Eubanks, More Than Meets the Ear (ArtistShare, 2015)
 Jon Faddis, Hornucopia (Epic, 1991)
 Tom Harrell, Time's Mirror (RCA Victor, 1999)
 Tom Harrell, Wise Children (Bluebird/Arista, 2003)
 Stefon Harris, The Grand Unification Theory (Blue Note, 2003)
 Jimmy Heath, Turn Up the Heath (Planet Arts, 2006)
 Joe Henderson, Big Band (Verve, 1996)
 Christopher Hollyday, And I'll Sing Once More (Novus, 1992)
 Jane Horrocks, The Further Adventures of Little Voice (Liberty, 2000)
 J. J. Johnson, The Brass Orchestra (Verve, 1997)
 Nino Josele, Espanola (DRO, 2009)
 Christian McBride, The Good Feeling (Mack Avenue, 2011)
 Christian McBride, Bringin' It (Mack Avenue, 2017)
 Christian McBride, For Jimmy, Wes and Oliver (Mack Avenue, 2020)
 Arturo O'Farrill, Una Noche Inolvidable (Palmetto, 2005)
 Arturo O'Farrill, Song for Chico (Zoho, 2008)
 Renee Rosnes, Life On Earth (Blue Note, 2001)
 Sam Rivers, Jazzbuhne Berlin '82 (Repertoire, 1990)
 Gary Smulyan, Blue Suite (Criss Cross, 1999)
 Mel Torme, Recorded Live at the Fujitsu-Concord Jazz Festival in Japan '90 (Concord Jazz, 1991)
 Bebo Valdes, Suite Cubana (Calle 54, 2009)
 Bobby Watson, Tailor Made (Columbia, 1993)
 Frank Wess, Entre Nous (Concord Jazz, 1991)
 Nancy Wilson, Turned to Blue (MCG, 2006)

References

Living people
American jazz trombonists
Male trombonists
Manhattan School of Music alumni
Towson University alumni
1952 births
People from Dundalk, Maryland
Jazz musicians from Maryland
21st-century trombonists
21st-century American male musicians
American male jazz musicians
Christian McBride Big Band members